Dabeeru C. Rao (born 6 April 1946) is an Indian-American statistical geneticist. He is professor and director of the Division of Biostatistics at Washington University School of Medicine.

Born in 1946, Rao was educated at the Indian Statistical Institute, where he received his Ph.D. in 1971. His Ph.D. thesis was entitled A Statistical Study of Tongue Pigmentation in Man, and his doctoral advisor was C. R. Rao. From 1971 to 1979, he was a geneticist in the University of Hawaii's  Population Genetics Laboratory, where he worked with Newton Morton. In 1980, he joined  the faculty of Washington University School of Medicine as associate professor and founding director of the Division of Biostatistics. He was promoted to full professor there in 1982, and has remained director of the Division of Biostatistics since 1980.

Rao was the president of the International Genetic Epidemiology Society in 1996, and served as the founding editor-in-chief of its official journal,  Genetic Epidemiology,  in 1984. He was elected a fellow of the American Statistical Association in 2013.

References

External links
Faculty page

Living people
1946 births
Scientists from Andhra Pradesh
Indian emigrants to the United States
Biostatisticians
American geneticists
Indian geneticists
Washington University School of Medicine faculty
Indian Statistical Institute alumni
Fellows of the American Statistical Association
Statistical geneticists
Academic journal editors
Genetic epidemiologists